Oxycoleus piceus is a species of beetle in the family Cerambycidae. It was described by Giesbert in 1993.

References

Cerambycinae
Beetles described in 1993